Shamoun Hanne Haydo (Syriac: ܫܡܥܘܢ ܚܢܢܐ ܚܝܕܐ) was a Syriac Christian (also known as Arameans) leader during the early 20th century. He was well known for defending Christian communities during the Sayfo in Tur abdin.

Bibliography
MARDIN 1915 Yves Ternon, Book 1, Part 4, Chapter 2 "Deïr el-Omar Mar Gabriel, Kefarbé, Bâsabrina"
Şemune Hanne Haydo In The Context Public Hero

1917 deaths
1870 births
Syriac Orthodox Christians